Vojče Lefkoski  (born March 8, 1991), is a Macedonian professional basketball player who plays for KK Gostivar of the Macedonian First League.

Professional career
On his debut for Blokotehna he scored 11 points and 3 rebounds in an 81-78 win against MZT Skopje.

References

External links
Vojče Lefkoski at eurobasket.com
Vojče Lefkoski at druga-aba liga.com

1991 births
Living people
Guards (basketball)
Macedonian men's basketball players
People from Gostivar